Sehjra is a town and Union Council of Kasur District in the Punjab province of Pakistan.

References

Kasur District